Cheon Hui-ju (born 5 October 1975) is a South Korean speed skater. She competed at the 1994 Winter Olympics and the 1998 Winter Olympics.

References

1975 births
Living people
South Korean female speed skaters
Olympic speed skaters of South Korea
Speed skaters at the 1994 Winter Olympics
Speed skaters at the 1998 Winter Olympics
Speed skaters at the 1996 Asian Winter Games
Medalists at the 1996 Asian Winter Games
Asian Games medalists in speed skating
Asian Games gold medalists for South Korea
Universiade bronze medalists for South Korea
Universiade medalists in speed skating
Competitors at the 1997 Winter Universiade
20th-century South Korean women